The Journal of the American Musicological Society is a peer-reviewed academic journal and an official journal of the American Musicological Society. It is published by University of California Press and covers all aspects of musicology.

The Journal of the American Musicological Society has been published three times a year since 1948. It was preceded by the annual Bulletin of the American Musicological Society (1936–1947) and the annual Papers of the American Musicological Society (1936–1941). Online versions of the journal and its predecessors are available at JSTOR and the University of California Press.

External links
 

Publications established in 1948
Triannual journals
English-language journals
Music journals
University of California Press academic journals